Wright Aeronautical (1919–1929) was an American aircraft manufacturer headquartered in Paterson, New Jersey. It was the successor corporation to Wright-Martin. It built aircraft and was a supplier of aircraft engines to other builders in the golden age of aviation. Wright engines were used by Amelia Earhart and Charles Lindbergh. In 1929, the company merged with Curtiss Aeroplane and Motor Corporation to form Curtiss-Wright.

History

In 1916, the Wright brothers' original aviation firm, the Wright Company, merged with Glenn L. Martin's firm, the Glenn L. Martin Company of California, to form the Wright-Martin Aircraft Corporation. In September 1917, Martin resigned from Wright-Martin and re-formed an independent Glenn L. Martin Company of Ohio (later of Maryland). After World War I in 1919, Wright-Martin was renamed Wright Aeronautical. It moved to Paterson, New Jersey in 1919.

In February 1919, an airplane with a Wright engine broke the world's speed record at 163 2–3 miles per hour. In November 1920, an airplane with a 300-horsepower Wright engine came in second place in the first Pulitzer Trophy Race in Long Island, New York. Other planes using Wright engines came in fourth and fifth place in the race.

In 1920, Wright produced a canon engine for the Army that allowed shells to be fired through the airplane's propeller. In 1921, a 300 horsepower engine by Wright again came in second place at the Pulitzer Trophy Race in Omaha, Nebraska. In 1921, Wright developed a new six-cylinder dirigible engine with 400 horsepower, testing it for nine months. In 1922, a plane with a Wright H-2 engine won the Mitchell Trophy Race.

In May 1923, Wright Aeronautical purchased the Lawrance Aero Engine Company, acquiring Charles Lawrance's J-1 radial engine. Lawrance became a vice president of Wright. In 1925, Wright's president, Frederick B. Rentschler, left the company to found Pratt & Whitney Aircraft Company; Lawrance replaced him as company president. Rentschler poached several talented personnel from Wright to join his new firm.

Working off Lawrance's designs, Wright Aeronautical developed an air-cooled engine, the Model J Whirlwind series. In 1925, a Wright-Bellanca airplane won the Pulitzer Trophy Race using a Wright Whirlwind engine. In 1927, a Wright J-5C Whirlwind engine was used by Charles Lindbergh in the Spirit of St. Louis when he flew from New York City to Paris. Wright engines were also used by other famed aviators, including Richard E. Byrd, Clarence Chamberlin, and Amelia Earhart.

Wright Aeronautical merged with the Curtiss Aeroplane and Motor Company on July 5, 1929, to become the Curtiss-Wright Corporation. Their engine divisions merged in 1931.

During World War II, the Paterson plant had 24,000 employees, working in three daily shifts. They made some 75,000 engines for the B-25, the Boeing B-17, and other aircraft. Wright also made engines for 44 commercial airlines and rocket engines for space travel. However, the Paterson plant closed in 1946.

Products

Aircraft

Aircraft engines

See also 
 Wright Company
 Curtiss-Wright

References

More information

External links

Defunct aircraft manufacturers of the United States
.
Wright brothers
Defunct aircraft engine manufacturers of the United States
American companies established in 1919
Vehicle manufacturing companies established in 1919
Vehicle manufacturing companies disestablished in 1929
1919 establishments in New Jersey
1929 disestablishments in New Jersey
Defunct manufacturing companies based in New Jersey
Former components of the Dow Jones Industrial Average
Wright aircraft engines